Abes is a monotypic moth genus of the family Erebidae. Its only species, Abes vedi is known from north-western Thailand. Both the genus and the species were first described by Michael Fibiger in 2010.

The wingspan is about 10 mm. The head, patagia, anterior part of the tegulae, prothorax, basal part of the costa, and the costal part of the medial area are greyish brown. The costal medial area is quadrangular. The forewing ground colour is unicolorous grey brown, suffused with black scales and the fringes are dark grey. The crosslines are indistinct. The terminal line is marked by black interneural dots.

References

Micronoctuini
Noctuoidea genera
Moths of Asia
Monotypic moth genera